

By country

 Albania
 Canada
 England
 Iran
Ireland
 Liberia
 Poland
 by voivodships
 United States

Lists of populated places
 Counties